Supplanaxis is a genus of small sea snails, marine gastropod mollusks in the subfamily Planaxinae of the family Planaxidae.

Species
Species within the genus Supplanaxis include:
 Supplanaxis acutus (Krauss, 1848)
  † Supplanaxis beaumonti (Bayan, 1870)
 Supplanaxis leyteensis Poppe, Tagaro & Stahlschmidt, 2015 
 Supplanaxis nancyae (Petuch, 2013)
 Supplanaxis niger (Quoy & Gaimard, 1833) 
 Supplanaxis nucleus (Bruguière, 1789)
 Supplanaxis obsoletus (Menke, 1851)
 Supplanaxis planicostatus (G. B. Sowerby I, 1825)
Species brought into synonymy
 Supplanaxis abbreviatus (Pease, 1865): synonym of Supplanaxis niger (Quoy & Gaimard, 1833)
 Supplanaxis acuta [sic] : synonym of Supplanaxis acutus (Krauss, 1848)

References

 Thiele, J. (1929-1935). Handbuch der systematischen Weichtierkunde. Jena, Gustav Fischer, 1154 pp

External links
 

Planaxidae